The 1935–36 Palestine League was the fourth season of league football in the British Mandate for Palestine. It began on 7 December 1935 and ended on 18 December 1936. The defending champions were Hapoel Tel Aviv.

Due to the 1936–1939 Arab revolt only six teams took part in the league, and the league schedule was inconsistent. The championship was won by Maccabi Tel Aviv.

League table

References
RSSSF
100 Years of Football 1906-2006, Elisha Shohat (Israel), 2006

Palestine League seasons
Palestine
1935–36 in Mandatory Palestine football